The Patterson River is a partly man-made urban river of the Port Phillip catchment in the Australian east coast state of Victoria, located in the outer southeastern suburbs of the Greater Melbourne region.

Location and features

The man-made river was constructed in 1878 as the Patterson Cut to assist the drainage of coastal swamplands located in what is now the suburb of Carrum. The river then flows generally southwest (picking up numerous minor drainage channels) and drops to a lower level at a weir and fishway underneath the Mornington Peninsula Freeway, before emptying into Beaumaris Bay, an eastern bight of Port Phillip Bay, just north of the Edithvale Wetlands. The waterway descends merely  over its  course, and provides boat access to canals and marinas in the suburbs of Patterson Lakes, Carrum and Bonbeach.

As one of the few designated safe harbours on the city side of the bay, the Patterson River is the most popular boating gateway to Port Phillip Bay. The thriving canal system of the Patterson Lakes residential area and the wet and dry storage at the Patterson Lakes Marina combine with four public boat ramps to make an extremely busy waterway.

The river is traversed by the Nepean Highway at Carrum, and the Mornington Peninsula Freeway at Patterson Lakes.

History
In 1866, the Carrum Carrum Swamp was surveyed and the land between Mordialloc Creek and Keast Park in Seaford was divided into 18 allotments and sold by auction for around three pounds per acre. In 1871 the government opened it for selection. The swamp was an impediment to the settlers and there was much discussion on how to reclaim the land, the first contracts for drainage works commenced in 1873. Attempts to reclaim the lower swamplands were ineffective. It was to be known as the "Patterson Cut" and was named after Sir James Patterson , at the time the Victorian Minister for Public Works; and later Premier.

The suburb of Patterson Lakes was to be located in Carrum on what was originally part of the Carrum Carrum Swamp. The Carrum Carrum Swamp was drained in 1879 when the Patterson Cut (formed in 1876), and other drainage measures were undertaken to prevent flooding of the Eumemmering Creek, which overflowed into the Carrum Carrum Swamp. When the Patterson Cut was dug the area that is now occupied by Patterson Lakes was turned to farmland with mainly dairy cattle. By the late 1960s farming activities had just about ceased, and the area was popular with fox and rabbit shooters.

In 1974 the first soil was turned in the preliminary stages of the development of Patterson Lakes, where sites for housing and apartments overlooking the marina and the river were identified. A canal system called the Tidal Canal and the Quiet Lakes were developed, where the Tidal Canal adjoined to the Patterson River.

Ecology
Indigenous floral species along the Patterson River include the silver wattle, lightwood, blackwood, black she-oak, river red gum, spike wattle, hedge wattle, scrub she-oak, jagged fireweed, silvertop wallaby grass, Australian salt-grass and the blue tussock grass. Non-indigenous floral species include the sheep's burr, angled onion, lesser joyweed, broom spurge, common swamp wallaby grass, pointed centrolepis, common spikerush and small spikerush.

Reptilian species include the Bougainville's skink, grass skink, tree dragon, copperhead snake and tiger snake. Aquatic species include the striped marsh frog, water rat, platypus, bream, flathead, tupong, Australian salmon, leatherjacket, yellow-eye mullet, silver trevally, black crab, spider crab, eel, bass yabbies, mussels and pippies. Bird species include the nankeen (rufous) night heron, white-faced heron, chestnut teal, straw-necked ibis, pacific black duck, pacific gull, silver gull, magpie-lark, Australian pelican, little pied cormorant, royal spoonbill, masked lapwing, whiskered (marsh) tern and caspian tern.

The Patterson River abounds with fish. There have been several reports of illegal fishing over the years, however the fish populations always seem to fight back in this popular waterway. A number of charter companies operate from Patterson River. Bream and a few other varieties of fish can be sourced from the Tidal Canal and Patterson River systems.

Facilities
Adjacent to the river, there are a number of recreational facilities, including:
 Undercover picnic areas and electric barbecues
 Bike trails to Mordialloc, Dandenong, Mount Eliza, Frankston and Melbourne
 Plentiful estuary fishing (bream, mullet) and well equipped tackle and bait
 Boardwalks and an indoor/outdoor cafe
 Coast Guard on duty weekends
 Charter vessels
 Public launching ramps at Launching Way, located off McLeod Road, Carrum, that provide water access for approximately  boats per annum.

Gallery

See also

 Patterson Lakes
 Patterson Lakes Marina

References

External links
 

Melbourne Water catchment
Rivers of Greater Melbourne (region)
City of Kingston (Victoria)
City of Greater Dandenong